Club Deportivo Manchego Ciudad Real is a Spanish football club based in Ciudad Real, Ciudad Real province, in the autonomous community of Castile-La Mancha. Founded in 2009 it plays in Tercera División – Group 18, holding home games at Estadio Juan Carlos I, which holds 3,000 spectators.

History

CD Manchego Ciudad Real was founded in 2009 with the name of Club Deportivo Ciudad Real. The club was renamed again as Manchego in July 2016.

Season to season

9 seasons in Tercera División
1 season in Tercera División RFEF

References

External links
Official website 

 
Association football clubs established in 2009
2009 establishments in Spain
Sport in Ciudad Real